Lands Museum is the cultural and natural history centre for Nordre and Søndre Land municipalities in Innlandet county, Norway.

The museum lies at the northern end of Norway’s fourth largest lake, Randsfjorden, and is near the Dokka Delta nature reserve. The museum was founded in 1927. Lands Museum is  now a part of Randsfjordmuseene together with Hadeland Folkemuseum at Tingelstad in Gran, Hadeland Bergverksmuseum at Lunner  and  Kittilbu Utmarksmuseum in Gausdal. 

The museum contains more than 30 historical buildings the oldest dating from ca. 1630.  Among them is a 17th-century house from Thomle farm (Thomlebygningen) with rococo paintings by the rural artist Peder Aadnes (1739–92). New to the museum is a middle ages section with a reconstructed hearth cottage. In the administration building are comprehensive archive, photograph and artifact collections, and a new beaver exhibition. The museum also has an amphitheater for concerts, theater and film performances.

References

Related reading
Janike Sverdrup Ugelstad (2007)  Thi han blev en kunstmaler: Peder Aadnes og hans billedverden (Oslo: Novus forlag)

External links
Lands Museum website
Randsfjordmuseene website
Opplandmuseum guide

Nordre Land
Museums in Innlandet
Natural history museums in Norway
Open-air museums in Norway